Keith M L Yeung (born 10 April 1988) is a horse racing jockey. He made his first start on 3 June 2007 in Australia and become Hong Kong's champion apprentice in 2009/10. In 2010/11 he partnered 18 winners for a Hong Kong career total of 57. In the 2012/13 season he rode 22 winners and in an injury interrupted 2013/14 season he scored 16 wins for an overall total of 132 HK wins.

Performance

References

External links
The Hong Kong Jockey Club

Hong Kong jockeys
Living people
1988 births